Brute Force (also known as Primitive Man) is a 1914 short silent drama film directed by D. W. Griffith, and starring Robert Harron and Mae Marsh. The film was shot in Chatsworth Park, Chatsworth, Los Angeles, California.  It is a story of cavemen and dinosaurs, and perhaps the first live-action dinosaur film. It is a sequel to Griffith's earlier film, "Man's Genesis" (1912).

Plot summary

Cast
 Robert Harron as Harry Faulkner (Prologue) / Weakhands (The Old Days)
 Mae Marsh as Lillywhite
 William J. Butler as Priscilla's Father (Prologue)
 Wilfred Lucas as Brute Force
 Edwin Curglot as Caveman
 Alfred Paget as In Club (Prologue) / Tribesman (The Old Days)
 Jennie Lee as Cavewoman
Rest of cast listed alphabetically:
 Edwin August		
 Lionel Barrymore		
 Harry Carey as In Womanless Tribe (The Old Days)
 John T. Dillon as In Club (Prologue)
 Frank Evans as In Club (Prologue) / Tribesman (The Old Days)
 Harry Hyde as In Club (Prologue)
 J. Jiquel Lanoe as In Club (Prologue) / Tribesman (The Old Days)
 Elmo Lincoln as In Club (Prologue) / Tribesman (The Old Days)
 Charles Hill Mailes as Valet (Prologue) / Tribesman (The Old Days)
 Joseph McDermott as In Club (Prologue) / Tribesman (The Old Days)
 W. C. Robinson as Valet (Prologue) / Tribesman (The Old Days)
 George Siegmann (unconfirmed)
 Blanche Sweet (unconfirmed)
 Kate Toncray as Tribeswoman (The Old Days)

In Popular Culture
Footage from the film was used in the animated series SpongeBob SquarePants for the episode "Ugh".

See also
 D. W. Griffith filmography
 Harry Carey filmography
 Lionel Barrymore filmography
 Blanche Sweet filmography

References

External links
 
 

1914 films
1910s fantasy drama films
1914 short films
American fantasy drama films
American silent short films
American black-and-white films
Films about dinosaurs
Films about cavemen
Films directed by D. W. Griffith
Films shot in Los Angeles
Biograph Company films
1914 drama films
1910s American films
Silent American drama films
Silent American fantasy films
Silent fantasy drama films
1910s English-language films